Michael J. Flynn (born May 20, 1934) is an American professor emeritus at Stanford University.

Early life and education
Flynn was born in New York City.

Career

Flynn proposed Flynn's taxonomy, a method of classifying parallel digital computers,  in 1966.

In the early 1970s, he was the founding chairman of IEEE Computer Society's Technical Committee on Computer Architecture (TCCA) and Association for Computing Machinery's Special Interest Group on Computer Architecture, ACM SIGARCH (initially SICARCH). Flynn encouraged from the beginning, joint cooperation between the two groups which now sponsors many leading joint symposiums and conferences like ACM/IEEE International Symposium on Computer Architecture (ISCA).

In 1995 he received a Harry H. Goode Memorial Award.

In 2009, Flynn received an honorary doctorate from the University of Belgrade.

Flynn co-founded Palyn Associates with Maxwell Paley and in 2014 is Chairman of Maxeler Technologies.

Bibliography

References

External links
 Stanford page
 Curriculum Vitae
 Flynn, Mike (Michael J.) oral history | Computer History Museum

Living people
1934 births
Place of birth missing (living people)
Manhattan College alumni
Flynn's taxonomy
American computer scientists
Stanford University faculty